The 1910 Dartmouth football team was an American football team that represented Dartmouth College as an independent during the 1910 college football season. In its first and only season under head coach W. J. Randall, the team compiled a 5–2 record, shut out four of seven opponents, and outscored all opponents by a total of 81 to 27. John J. Ryan was the team captain.

Schedule

References

Dartmouth
Dartmouth Big Green football seasons
Dartmouth football